Balteus may refer to:

The girdle of a Biblical Jewish priest
A sword belt worn by the Roman legionary; see Baldric#Roman balteus
In Ionic architecture, an ornamental band
In Ionic architecture, an ornamental band that encircles the pulvinus, or bolster of the capital
The sub-cinctorium, a papal garment